The  opened in Matsue, Shimane Prefecture, Japan in 1999. Designed by Kiyonori Kikutake and with a total floor area of 12,500 square metres, it houses a collection of Japanese and Western art, including Momoyama folding screens and paintings by Corot, Sisley, Monet, and Gauguin.

See also
  Shimane Museum of Ancient Izumo

References

External links

  Shimane Art Museum - homepage
  Shimane Art Museum - English language site
 

Museums in Shimane Prefecture
Art museums and galleries in Japan
Prefectural museums
Art museums established in 1999
1999 establishments in Japan